The Grand Canyon Antelopes men's soccer program represents Grand Canyon University in all NCAA Division I men's college soccer competitions. Founded in 1985, the Antelopes have competed in the Western Athletic Conference since 2013. The Lopes are coached by Mike Kraus. GCU plays its home matches at GCU Stadium.

NCAA Tournament history 

After transitioning from NCAA Division II to Division I, GCU was eligible for the Division I postseason for the first time in 2017. The Lopes qualified for the NCAA Tournament in just their second season of Division I eligibility, winning the Western Athletic Conference Men's Soccer Tournament in 2018 behind three consecutive 1–0 shutout victories.

Grand Canyon qualified for the NCAA Tournament seven times at the Division II level, highlighted by a Division II National Championship in 1996.

Facility history 

The Lopes played at GCU Soccer Field up until the construction of GCU Stadium. GCU played its inaugural season in the new facility in 2016. Since the opening of the facility, GCU has ranked in the top 10 in average attendance per match in 2016 and 2018, getting significant fan support from the university's student section, the GCU Havocs.

GCU Stadium hosted its first game on August 26, 2016, when GCU defeated UCF 4–2. The crowd of 6,402 fans was the ninth-largest crowd in the 2016 NCAA Division I men's soccer season.

GCU hosted the fourth-largest crowd of the 2018 NCAA Division I men's soccer season when it opened the season by defeating Wisconsin 2–1 in front of 6,648 fans.

Notable seasons

2018 
The 2018 team qualified for the program's first ever NCAA Division I Men's Soccer Tournament by going 3–0 in the WAC Tournament.

GCU finished as the nation's most improved defense, ranking 181st nationally in goals against average in 2017 before jumping to 25th in 2018.

The Lopes finished the season 5–0 against top-25 opponents, defeating No. 12 Wisconsin, No. 20 Creighton, No. 25 Seattle U, and Air Force twice, once as No. 8 and once as No. 13.

1996 
Grand Canyon won the NCAA Division II Men's Soccer Championship by defeating Seattle Pacific, Lynn and Oakland.

Coaching history 
GCU has had five head coaches in its program history.

Notable alumni 
 Matheau Hall, professional soccer player
 Niki Jackson, Colorado Rapids and 2018 MLS SuperDraft pick
 Hector Montalvo, Tigres UANL
 Saeed Robinson, Colorado Springs Switchbacks
 Amer Sasivarevic, OKC Energy FC and 2018 MLS SuperDraft pick (program's first MLS SuperDraft pick)
 Evan Waldrep, Phoenix Rising FC
 Esai Easley, Sporting Kansas City and 2022 MLS SuperDraft pick
 Justin Rasmussen, Portland Timbers and 2022 MLS SuperDraft pick

References

External links 
 

 
1985 establishments in Arizona
Association football clubs established in 1985